The Oregon State Savings Bank Building is an historic building in the Ogle County, Illinois city of Oregon. Its location is within the boundaries of the Oregon Commercial Historic District. The historic district was designated and added to the National Register of Historic Places in August 2006.

Notes

Buildings and structures in Oregon Commercial Historic District
Historic district contributing properties in Illinois
Bank buildings on the National Register of Historic Places in Illinois